Brian "Bryn" Jones (born 15 September 1938) is an English former professional footballer who played as a full-back in the Football League for Barnsley and York City.

References

1938 births
Living people
Footballers from Barnsley
English footballers
Association football fullbacks
Barnsley F.C. players
York City F.C. players
English Football League players